Durban Art Gallery is a municipal art gallery in Durban, South Africa. It is run by eThekwini Metropolitan Municipality. It was established in 1892.

References

Art museums and galleries in South Africa
Museums in KwaZulu-Natal
Culture of Durban